The Kansas City Museum is located in Kansas City, Missouri, United States. In 1910, the site was built by lumber baron and civic leader Robert A. Long as his private family estate, with the four-story historic Beaux-Arts style mansion named Corinthian Hall. In 1940, the site was donated by Long's heirs to become a public museum. Seventy-five years later, it began extensive renovation.

Background 
The  estate consists of Corinthian Hall, named for its Corinthian columns, and its outbuildings. Built for Robert A. Long and his family, this private residence was completed in 1910 for an estimated  (equivalent to $ in ). It was designed by local architect Henry F. Hoit. Daughters Sally and Loula removed decorative items and architectural features from Corinthian Hall for installation in their own homes, and held a two-day auction in late 1934 to sell the remainder of the items. Then, the mansion sat empty and was for sale. Very little remained of the original furniture, and some rooms lost all architectural fabric. These changes lessened the value of the building as a "historic house". Still, the Longs' daughters donated the estate to the Kansas City Museum Association in 1939. In 1940, it was opened to the public as a history and science museum. Facing financial difficulties, the museum was deeded to the City of Kansas City, Missouri in 1948.

In the 1950s, the museum focused on display and interpretation of natural history. Early in 1951, taxidermy specimen displays expanded into the basement, along with mineralogical exhibits of fossils, rocks, and minerals. During its heyday in the 1950s and 1960s, the museum housed hundreds of stuffed animals in lifelike dioramas and offered various presentations and classes in taxidermy. It featured a 50-seat planetarium, and a 1910-style soda fountain serving phosphates and ice cream.

By the 1970s, museum staff realized that the building was too small for its potential in local history and science and began to split it. Museum staff and civic leaders considered the newly empty Union Station as a potential site for a new science museum.

From 2005 to December 2013, the museum was managed by Union Station Kansas City, Inc., which maintains Union Station. In January 2008, the primary buildings of the museum—the residence and carriage house—closed for major renovations of roofing, masonry, art glass, energy efficient windows, elevator, and HVAC.

Since May 2014, the City of Kansas City and Missouri's Parks and Recreation Department operate and manage the Kansas City Museum.

References

External links

Corinthian Hall at the R. A. Long Historical Society website

Houses on the National Register of Historic Places in Missouri
Beaux-Arts architecture in Missouri
Houses completed in 1909
City museums in the United States
Planetaria in the United States
Museums in Kansas City, Missouri
History museums in Missouri
Natural history museums in Missouri
Biographical museums in Missouri
National Register of Historic Places in Kansas City, Missouri
Gilded Age mansions